Old West Church may refer to:

Old West Church (Boston, Massachusetts), a historic church, counterpart to Old North Church
Old West Church (Calais, Vermont), listed on the NRHP in Vermont